Michael Wenczel (born 23 November 1977 in Heilbronn) is a German former professional footballer who played as a defender. He also holds Hungarian citizenship.

References

1977 births
Living people
German footballers
Association football defenders
Eintracht Frankfurt players
Eintracht Frankfurt II players
FC Augsburg players
FC Ingolstadt 04 players
FC Ingolstadt 04 II players
VfR Mannheim players
2. Bundesliga players
3. Liga players
Sportspeople from Heilbronn
Footballers from Baden-Württemberg